A Night at the Roxbury is a 1998 American comedy film based on a recurring sketch on television's long-running Saturday Night Live called "The Roxbury Guys". Saturday Night Live regulars Will Ferrell, Chris Kattan, Molly Shannon, Mark McKinney and Colin Quinn star. This film expands on the original Saturday Night Live sketches where the Roxbury Guys were joined by that week's host, and bobbed their heads to Haddaway's hit song "What Is Love" while being comically rejected by women at various clubs.

Other roles include Jennifer Coolidge as a police officer, Chazz Palminteri's uncredited role as gregarious night club impresario Mr. Benny Zadir, and Colin Quinn as his bodyguard Dooey. Ex-SNLer Mark McKinney has a cameo as a priest officiating a wedding.

Plot
Steve and Doug Butabi are sons of a wealthy businessman and in their spare time, enjoy frequenting nightclubs, where they bob their heads in unison to Eurodance, a European subgenre of EDM, and fail miserably at picking up women. Their goal is to party at the Roxbury, a fabled Los Angeles nightclub where they are continually denied entry by a hulking bouncer.

By day, the brothers work at an artificial plant store owned by their wealthy father, Kamehl. They spend most of their time goofing off, daydreaming about opening a club as cool as the Roxbury together, and Doug using credit card transactions as an excuse to flirt with a card approval associate via telephone that he calls "Credit Vixen." The store shares a wall with a lighting emporium owned by Fred Sanderson. Mr. Butabi and Mr. Sanderson hope that Steve and Emily, Sanderson's daughter, will marry, uniting the families and the businesses to form the first plant-lamp emporium.

After a day at the beach, the brothers decide that night was to be the night they would finally get into the Roxbury. Returning home, Doug gets into a heated argument with their father about going out clubbing instead of staying home. Their father has planned a dinner party with Emily and her parents. The angered Mr. Butabi then refuses them access to their BMW car and their cell phones. They are given enormous cell phones by their mother, Barbara, and allowed use of the plant store's delivery van. The brothers go to the Roxbury when they are asked their names, being told they’re not on the list and are denied entry.

After discovering that they might bribe their way into the club, the brothers drive around looking for an ATM slamming on the brakes again and again while in traffic causing them to get into a fender-bender with Richard Grieco. Grieco explains to the girl with him in the passenger seat that his car is a racing car and therefore illegal. To avoid a lawsuit, Grieco uses his fame to get them into the popular club. There, they meet the owner of the Roxbury, Benny Zadir, who listens to their idea for their own nightclub. He likes them and sets up a meeting with them for the next day. The brothers also meet a pair of women at the Roxbury: Vivica and Cambi, who see them talking to Zadir and think that the brothers are rich. The women later sleep with Doug and Steve, leading the brothers to think they are in serious relationships.

On the way to the after-party at Mr. Zadir's house, the brothers annoy his driver and bodyguard Dooey by making him stop to buy fluffy whip and making jokes about sleeping with his parents. As revenge, the next day, Dooey refuses them entry into Zadir's office for their meeting. He tells the brothers that Zadir was drunk out of his mind last night and does not know who they are. In reality, Zadir wanted to see them, but does not have their contact information.

Vivica and Cambi break up with the Butabi brothers after realizing they are not actually wealthy. Afterwards, the brothers argue over who is at fault for their sudden misfortune and Doug moves out of their shared bedroom and into the guest house. Meanwhile, Steve is forced into an engagement with Emily by his father. The wedding is held in the backyard of the Butabi residence, but is interrupted by Doug. The brothers reconcile and leave, but their friend and personal trainer Craig, reveals his feelings for Emily, and marries her. Afterwards, Grieco consoles Mr. Butabi to help him understand that Steve was not ready for marriage, and that Butabi is too hard on Doug.

After the Butabi brothers reconcile with their father and Doug moves back into their bedroom, the film ends as the brothers happen upon a hot new club. The building is unique in that the exterior is constructed to resemble the interior of a nightclub, and the interior resembles a street—this was an idea pitched by Doug and Steve to Zadir earlier in the film. Attempting to enter, they're asked their names and much to their surprise are told they are on the list. They walk into the club where they find Zadir and Zadir reveals that to reward their idea, he has made them part-owners of the club. Their new-found success comes full circle when they meet two women in the club: Doug's phone operator from the credit card company ("Credit Vixen") and a police officer with whom Steve flirted while getting a ticket.

Cast

 Will Ferrell as Steve Butabi
 Chris Kattan as Doug Butabi
 Loni Anderson as Barbara Butabi
 Dan Hedaya as Kamehl Butabi
 Molly Shannon as Emily Sanderson
 Dwayne Hickman as Fred Sanderson
 Maree Cheatham as Mabel Sanderson
 Lochlyn Munro as Craig
 Richard Grieco as himself
 Kristen Dalton as Grieco's lady
 Jennifer Coolidge as Hottie Police Officer
 Meredith Scott Lynn as Credit Vixen
 Gigi Rice as Vivica
 Elisa Donovan as Cambi
 Michael Clarke Duncan as Roxbury bouncer
 Colin Quinn as Dooey
 Twink Caplan as Crying flower customer
 Eva Mendes as Bridesmaid
 Mark McKinney as Father Williams
 Chazz Palminteri as Mr. Benny Zadir
 Joe Ranft as the hottie dancer
 Agata Gotova as Waitress

Soundtrack

Certifications

Production

In May 2019, Kattan claimed in his memoir that he was pressured by producer Lorne Michaels to have sex with Amy Heckerling so she would direct the film (although she ultimately only produced, rather than directed it).

Reception
A Night at the Roxbury was heavily panned by critics. On review aggregator site Rotten Tomatoes, it received a rating of 11% and an average rating of 3.4/10 based on 55 reviews. The site's critical consensus reads: "A Night at the Roxbury has the same problems as the worst SNL movies: one-note characters and plots unreasonably stretched to feature length runtime". Anita Gates of The New York Times acknowledged the film's appeal, but reasoned that it was "a lot like the brothers themselves: undeniably pathetic but strangely lovable. Still, do you really want to spend an hour and a half with them in a dark room?" Roger Ebert observed that "the sad thing about A Night at the Roxbury is that the characters are in a one-joke movie, and they're the joke... It's the first comedy I've attended where you feel that to laugh would be cruel to the characters."

References

External links

 
 
 
 
 
 
 

Saturday Night Live films
Saturday Night Live in the 1990s
1998 films
1990s buddy comedy films
1990s English-language films
Albums produced by Tim & Bob
Films directed by John Fortenberry
Films scored by David Kitay
American buddy comedy films
Films set in Los Angeles
Films shot in Los Angeles
Internet memes
Paramount Pictures films
Films produced by Lorne Michaels
Films with screenplays by Will Ferrell
1998 comedy films
1990s American films